Highway 50 (AR 50, Ark. 50, or Hwy. 50) is a designation for two east–west state highways in northeast Arkansas. A western route of  runs east from St. Francis County Route 415 (CR 415) to Highway 147 near Anthonyville. A second route of  begins at US Route 70 (US 70) and runs east to Highway 77 in Clarkedale.

Route description

Forrest City to Anthonyville
Highway 50 begins at CR 415 north of Forrest City and runs south across Interstate 40 (I-40), although there is no interchange. The route continues south to Madison where it intersects US 70. The highway then crosses over the St. Francis River to enter Widener, where a concurrency begins with Highway 38. The two routes run together east to serve as the southern terminus of Highway 75 before Highway 38 splits south to Hughes. Continuing east, a short concurrency begins with Highway 149, ending near Greasy Corner. Highway 50 runs east to serve as the southern terminus of Highway 357 before a junction with US 79 on the Crittenden County line. Shortly after entering Crittenden County, Highway 50 terminates at Highway 147 south of Anthonyville.

US 70 to Clarkedale
Highway 50 begins northwest of Edmondson at US 70, which acts as a frontage road for I-40/US 63/US 79. The route runs north across Highway 218 to Crawfordsville. In Crawfordsville, Highway 50 briefly overlaps US 64B before crossing US 64 just north of town. The highway continues north before later turning east to a junction with I-55/US 61/US 63 in Clarkedale. The route terminates just east of this interchange at Highway 77 in Clarkedale.

Major intersections

See also

 List of state highways in Arkansas

References

External links

050
Transportation in Crittenden County, Arkansas
Transportation in St. Francis County, Arkansas